Dennis Fraser Bevington (born March 27, 1953) is a Canadian politician from the Northwest Territories, and was the member of Parliament for the riding of Northwest Territories from 2006 until 2015. Born in Fort Smith, he served as mayor from 1988 to 1997. During Bevington's term at the head of council, Fort Smith recognized the Chipewyan and Cree languages, making the town officially quadrilingual.

A businessman, Bevington has long been active on environmental issues. In the 2000 federal election he ran as the NDP candidate for Western Arctic, but lost by 18% to incumbent Ethel Blondin-Andrew. Bevington ran again in the 2004 election, losing to Blondin-Andrew by only 53 votes, one of the closest races of the election. Bevington succeeded in unseating Blondin-Andrew in the 2006 election, with a margin of 1,158 votes. On October 19, 2015, Bevington was defeated for re-election by Liberal candidate Michael McLeod.

Bevington fought for years to have the name of the riding changed from Western Arctic to Northwest Territories.  Since 2008, Bevington has tabled three private member's bills titled "An Act to change the name of the electoral district of Western Arctic", all dying on the order paper. The task was more difficult as the riding name had been specified directly in the Electoral Boundaries Readjustment Act, rather than in the representation orders governing other riding names. Bevington finally succeeded in having the name change incorporated into a bill that changed several other riding names in 2014.

Electoral record

References

External links

1953 births
Living people
Mayors of places in the Northwest Territories
Members of the House of Commons of Canada from the Northwest Territories
New Democratic Party MPs
People from Fort Smith, Northwest Territories
21st-century Canadian politicians